Yıkılmayan Adam (The Indestructible Man) is a 1977 Turkish political film directed by  Remzi Aydın Jöntürk. It is the final film of his "The Adam Trilogy", following the 1976 Yarınsız Adam (Man Without Tomorrow) and Satılmış Adam (The Sold Man) of 1977. The film stars Cüneyt Arkın, Suna Yıldızoğlu, Eşref Kolçak and Levent Çakır.

Cast 
 Cüneyt Arkın as Çakır 
 Eşref Kolçak as Nadir
 Memduh Ün as Memeduh
 Suna Yıldızoğlu as Fatoş
 Macit Flordun as Gani
 Levent Çakır as Hayri

See also
 Cinema of Turkey

References

External links
  
  
 

1977 films
1970s Turkish-language films
Turkish independent films
Films about the labor movement
Films set in Turkey
Turkish sequel films
Political action films
Turkish vigilante films
Films about organized crime in Turkey
1970s crime action films
Gangster films
1970s vigilante films
1977 independent films